Gijuiyeh (also Romanized as Gījū’īyeh; also known as Giju, Gījūyeh, Kījū, and Kījū’īyeh) is a village in Dehsard Rural District, in the Central District of Arzuiyeh County, Kerman Province, Iran. At the 2006 census, its population was 222, in 51 families.

References 

Populated places in Arzuiyeh County